Chrysosplenium wrightii, or Wright's golden saxifrage, is a plant species native to northwestern North America and northeastern Asia. It grows on tundra and along stream banks at elevations up to 2300 m in British Columbia, Yukon, Alaska, the Kamchatka Peninsula in Russia, and in eastern Siberia. The plant was first described in 1878 as being from Japan. This was based on material collected along the Sea of Okhotsk presumably either Sakhalin Island or one of the Kuril Islands, parts of Japan at the time but now in the Russian Federation.

Two infraspecific taxa have been proposed, both names accepted by The Plant List:

Chrysosplenium wrightii var. beringanum (Rose) H.Hara, from St. Paul Island in Alaska
Chrysosplenium wrightii subsp. saxatile (Khokhr.) Vorosch., from Russia

Chrysosplenium wrightii is an herb reproducing by means of stolons running along the surface of the ground. Flowering stalks are up to 16 cm tall, bearing a cyme of up to 30 flowers. Flowers are yellow, purple, or orange, usually with purple spots.

References

wrightii
Flora of Russia
Flora of Alaska
Flora of British Columbia
Flora of Yukon
Flora without expected TNC conservation status